Tug of War is the seventh studio album by the American progressive rock band Enchant.  The live bonus track was recorded at NEARfest 2002 in Trenton, New Jersey.

Track listing
 "Sinking Sand" (Leonard, Ott, Platt) – 7:08
 "Tug Of War" (Ott) – 7:41
 "Hold The Wind" (Leonard, Ott, Platt) - 5:44
 "Beautiful" (Ott) – 4:27
 "Queen Of The Informed" (Leonard, Ott) – 7:01
 "Living In A Movie" (Jenkins, Ott) – 6:58
 "Long Way Down" (Leonard, Ott) – 4:57
 "See No Evil" (Leonard) – 5:52
 "Progtology" (Ott) – 6:48
 "Comatose" (Ott) – 8:50
 "Below Zero (Live)" – 6:28 Bonus track on Special Edition

Line-up
Ted Leonard – vocals and all guitars on 'See No Evil' (Except for the last solo)
Douglas A. Ott – guitars, piano on 'Comatose', mellotron on 'Progtology' and strings on 'Beautiful'
Ed Platt – bass guitar
Sean Flanegan – drums
Bill Jenkins – keyboards

References

2003 albums
Enchant (band) albums
Inside Out Music albums